Mehdiabad (also Romanized as Mehdīābād) is a village in Roshtkhar Rural District, in the Central District of Roshtkhar County, Razavi Khorasan Province, Iran. At the 2006 census, its population was 1,584, in 362 families.

References 

Populated places in Roshtkhar County